Oncești may refer to several places in Romania:

 Oncești, Bacău, a commune in Bacău County, and its village of Onceștii Vechi
 Oncești, Maramureș, a commune in Maramureș County
 Oncești, a village in Mogoș Commune, Alba County
 Oncești, a village in Voinești Commune, Dâmbovița County
 Oncești, a village in Stănești Commune, Giurgiu County